Maurício Rodrigues Alves Domingues (born 3 July 1978), known as just Maurício, is a former Brazilian football player.

Club statistics

References

External links

1978 births
Living people
Brazilian footballers
Brazilian expatriate footballers
J1 League players
Sport Club Corinthians Paulista players
Goiás Esporte Clube players
Esporte Clube Vitória players
Cruzeiro Esporte Clube players
Mirassol Futebol Clube players
Associação Portuguesa de Desportos players
Clube Náutico Capibaribe players
Clube Atlético Juventus players
Kashiwa Reysol players
Expatriate footballers in Japan

Association football midfielders